Bachir Mustafa Hammoud (1906–1945) (Bacheer Hammoud, Bachir Moustafa Hammoud Al-Choukini Al-Aameli, Bachir Moustafa Jawad Hammoud, Bachir Hammoud Al-Choukini Al-Aameli, Bachir Al-Aameli, Bachir Bin Jawad Bin Moustafa Hammoud) was a Lebanese philosopher, poet and Shī‘ah religious leader.

Early life and education

Activities and views
Wrote a poetry book, known as Diwan al Bachir (published by Dar Al Ishaa, Beirut), written in both formal and unformal Arabic. Poems deal with religion, Ahl El Bayt (Prophet Family) and Jabal Aamel (South Lebanon)

Selected poems from Diwan Al Bachir

Personal life

References

External links
Al-Hammoud
 Arab Poets
 Abdel El Raouf Fadlallah
 Arab Poets
Encyclopedia complete
Bachir Hammoud
 Al fakih

1906 births
1945 deaths
20th-century Lebanese poets
Lebanese Shia clerics
Lebanese male poets
20th-century male writers
20th-century Lebanese philosophers